Jesse Jackson Were (born 19 April 1989) is a Kenyan professional footballer who plays as a striker for Zambia Super League club Kansanshi Dynamos F.C. and the Kenya national team. He previously played for Mathare United and Tusker F.C.
Joined Kansanshi dynamos in 2021

Club

References

External links
 
 

1989 births
Living people
Footballers from Nairobi
Kenyan footballers
Association football forwards
Mathare United F.C. players
Tusker F.C. players
Kenyan Premier League players
ZESCO United F.C. players
Kenya international footballers